beatmania IIDX 7th Style is the seventh game in the beatmania IIDX series of music video games. It was released in arcades by Konami in March 2002.

Gameplay

Beatmania IIDX tasks the player with performing songs through a controller consisting of seven key buttons and a scratchable turntable. Hitting the notes with strong timing increases the score and groove gauge bar, allowing the player to finish the stage. Failing to do so depletes the gauge until it is empty, abruptly ending the song.

The core gameplay remains the same in 7th Style. 5-key mode has been changed from a difficulty to its own modifier, allowing it to be used on any difficulty level as with normal charts. A new spinoff of Expert Mode also debuted, Daninintei (Class) mode, a mode containing a series of courses ranked so that each course is more difficult than the last, the highest rank course a player can beat in Dan mode is often used to compare players. Dan mode would have significant integration in future styles implementing the e-Amusement system, which could save a player's rank, and may also restrict access to specific songs based on their current rank.

Music
This is the complete list of new songs from the arcade version of Beatmania IIDX 7th Style. Songs highlighted in green need to be unlocked. The Extra Stage (highlighted red) is "MAX 300", while the One More Extra Stage is "革命".

Burning Heat! (Full Option Mix) - a remix of the song Burning Heat! from Gradius II.
The Beauty of Silence by Svenson & Gielen, Never Look Back by DuMonde and The Sound of Goodbye by Perpetuous Dreamer are the last Avex Trax Trance licenses.
Extra Stage - To access the Extra Stage (or the One More Extra Stage from the Extra Stage), the player must AAA a flashing 7-ranked song with Hard mode on. The extra stage is MAX 300, a song well known as being the extra stage from DDRMAX: Dance Dance Revolution 6thMix (which had been released a few months before). The OMES is Kakumei, a remix of Chopin's Revolutionary Étude by dj TAKA with NAOKI (which is also the OMES of DDRMAX2).

Home version
The home version of 7th Style was released 2 years later in 2004 for the PlayStation 2. It was First Series that Developed from Konami Computer Entertainment Studio. It contained two preview songs from 8th and 9th Style, as well as some revivals. 5-Key was left as a mode instead of a modifier (unlike the arcade version), and unlike future home releases, the special Extra Stage methods were not present. Masters Mode was also introduced as a modified version of Survival Mode.

References

2002 video games
2004 video games
Arcade video games
Beatmania games
PlayStation 2 games
Japan-exclusive video games
Multiplayer and single-player video games
Video games developed in Japan